Phan Sakulnee (7 March 1942 – 12 January 2022), best known by the stage name Waiphot Phetsuphan, was a Thai luk thung and Phleng Lae singer and National Artist of Thailand in 1997. He is part of the reputation of "Queen of Luk thung", Pumpuang Duangjan, for whom he has written songs to Pumpuang including "Keaw Roe Phee" (แก้วรอพี่) and "Countryside Singer" (นักร้องบ้านนอก/Nak Rong Baan Nork).

Life and career
Phetsuphan was born in Suphan Buri Province on 7 March 1942. He was of Laotian descent. He became a singer in 1962. His popular songs include "Taeng Thao Tai" (แตงเถาตาย), "Fang Khao Thit Kaeo" (ฟังข่าวทิดแก้ว), and "Baeng Sombat" (แบ่งสมบัติ), etc. He died in Bangkok on 12 January 2022, at the age of 79.

Partial Discography
 "Taeng Thao Tai" (แตงเถาตาย)
 "Fang Khao Thit Kaeo" (ฟังข่าวทิดแก้ว)
 "Baeng Sombat" (แบ่งสมบัติ)
 แหล่ประวัติพุ่มพวง (1992)
 ท็อปฮิต อมตะเสียงสวรรค: หัวอกโชเฟอร์ (1993)
 ลูกทุ่งเบรคแตก (1995)
 "Nak Sang Seeka" (นาคสั่งสีกา) (with Tossapol Himmapan) (2000)

References

External Links
 

1942 births
2022 deaths
Waiphot Phetsuphan
Male singer-songwriters
Waiphot Phetsuphan
Waiphot Phetsuphan
Waiphot Phetsuphan
Waiphot Phetsuphan
Waiphot Phetsuphan